In algebraic topology, a quasifibration is a generalisation of fibre bundles and fibrations introduced by Albrecht Dold and René Thom. Roughly speaking, it is a continuous map p: E → B having the same behaviour as a fibration regarding the (relative) homotopy groups of E, B and p−1(x). Equivalently, one can define a quasifibration to be a continuous map such that the inclusion of each fibre into its homotopy fibre is a weak equivalence. One of the main applications of quasifibrations lies in proving the Dold-Thom theorem.

Definition
A continuous surjective map of topological spaces p: E → B is called a quasifibration if it induces isomorphisms

 

for all x ∈ B, y ∈ p−1(x) and i ≥ 0. For i = 0,1 one can only speak of bijections between the two sets.

By definition, quasifibrations share a key property of fibrations, namely that a quasifibration p: E → B induces a long exact sequence of homotopy groups

 

as follows directly from the long exact sequence for the pair (E, p−1(x)).

This long exact sequence is also functorial in the following sense: Any fibrewise map f: E → E′ induces a morphism between the exact sequences of the pairs (E, p−1(x)) and (E′, p′−1(x)) and therefore a morphism between the exact sequences of a quasifibration. Hence, the diagram

commutes with f0 being the restriction of f to p−1(x) and x′ being an element of the form p′(f(e)) for an e ∈ p−1(x).

An equivalent definition is saying that a surjective map p: E → B is a quasifibration if the inclusion of the fibre p−1(b) into the homotopy fibre Fb of p over b is a weak equivalence for all b ∈ B. To see this, recall that Fb is the fibre of q under b where q: Ep → B is the usual path fibration construction. Thus, one has

and q is given by q(e, γ) = γ(1). Now consider the natural homotopy equivalence φ : E → Ep, given by φ(e) = (e, p(e)), where p(e) denotes the corresponding constant path. By definition, p factors through Ep such that one gets a commutative diagram

Applying πn yields the alternative definition.

Examples

 Every Serre fibration is a quasifibration. This follows from the Homotopy lifting property.
 The projection of the letter L onto its base interval is a quasifibration, but not a fibration. More generally, the projection Mf → I of the mapping cylinder of a map f: X → Y between connected CW complexes onto the unit interval is a quasifibration if and only if πi(Mf, p−1(b)) =  0 = πi(I, b) holds for all i ∈ I and b ∈ B. But by the long exact sequence of the pair (Mf, p−1(b)) and by Whitehead's theorem, this is equivalent to f being a homotopy equivalence. For topological spaces X and Y in general, it is equivalent to f being a weak homotopy equivalence. Furthermore, if f is not surjective, non-constant paths in I starting at 0 cannot be lifted to paths starting at a point of Y outside the image of f in Mf. This means that the projection is not a fibration in this case.
 The map SP(p) : SP(X) → SP(X/A) induced by the projection p: X → X/A is a quasifibration for a CW pair (X, A) consisting of two connected spaces. This is one of the main statements used in the proof of the Dold-Thom theorem. In general, this map also fails to be a fibration.

Properties
The following is a direct consequence of the alternative definition of a fibration using the homotopy fibre:

Theorem. Every quasifibration p: E → B factors through a fibration whose fibres are weakly homotopy equivalent to the ones of p.

A corollary of this theorem is that all fibres of a quasifibration are weakly homotopy equivalent if the base space is path-connected, as this is the case for fibrations.

Checking whether a given map is a quasifibration tends to be quite tedious. The following two theorems are designed to make this problem easier. They will make use of the following notion: Let p: E → B be a continuous map. A subset U ⊂ p(E) is called distinguished (with respect to p) if p: p−1(U) → U is a quasifibration.

Theorem. If the open subsets U,V and U ∩ V are distinguished with respect to the continuous map p: E → B, then so is U ∪ V.

Theorem. Let p: E → B be a continuous map where B is the inductive limit of a sequence B1 ⊂ B2 ⊂ ... All Bn are moreover assumed to satisfy the first separation axiom. If all the Bn are distinguished, then p is a quasifibration.

To see that the latter statement holds, one only needs to bear in mind that continuous images of compact sets in B already lie in some Bn. That way, one can reduce it to the case where the assertion is known.
These two theorems mean that it suffices to show that a given map is a quasifibration on certain subsets. Then one can patch these together in order to see that it holds on bigger subsets and finally, using a limiting argument, one sees that the map is a quasifibration on the whole space. This procedure has e.g. been used in the proof of the Dold-Thom theorem.

Notes

References

External Links
 Quasifibrations and homotopy pullbacks on MathOverflow
 Quasifibrations from the Lehigh University

Algebraic topology